Ozone was an American magazine focusing on hip hop music coverage from the Southern United States and operated from 2002 to 2010. It was founded in Orlando, Florida in 2002 by Julia Beverly who was inspired by local rap artist & team member Ricardo Wright from Palm Beach County. In 2006, the magazine relocated its headquarters to Atlanta.

The magazine provided early coverage of southern artists including Stat Quo, Pitbull, and T-Pain. It has also included articles on musicians from other parts of the U.S. Ozone, including New York City rapper Saigon on the cover of the April 2006 issue and Chicago emcee Twista on the cover of its January 2006, and October 2007 issues.

The magazine has a small number of staff and contributors. In addition to publisher and editor-in-chief Julia Beverly, features editor Eric Perrin and music editor Randy Roper make frequent contributions. Other contributors include recording artist Killer Mike, Charlamagne, mixtape artist DJ Wally Sparks, Wendy Day (founder of Rap Coalition, and contributor to Murder Dog magazine), Rohit Loomba and DJ ADG.

Awards
The first annual Ozone Awards were held on August 6, 2006, and were hosted by Mississippi emcee David Banner and Miami emcee Trina. Ozone Magazine held its second annual Ozone Award Show on August 13, 2007 at the James L. Knight Center in downtown Miami, Florida, in conjunction with the TJ's DJs Tastemakers Conference. The 3rd Annual Ozone Award and TJs DJs Tastemakers Conference was held on the weekend of August 8–11, 2008 at the George R. Brown Convention Center in Houston, Texas. The awards focused on southern artists mostly and included performances by Lil Wayne, Trick Daddy, Rick Ross, Pimp C, and Too Short.

References

External links

Digital Copies of Ozone Magazine available to read at www.issuu.com

2002 establishments in Florida
2010 disestablishments in Georgia (U.S. state)
Defunct magazines published in the United States
Hip hop magazines
Magazines established in 2002
Magazines disestablished in 2010
Magazines published in Atlanta
Magazines published in Florida
Mass media in Orlando, Florida
Monthly magazines published in the United States
Music magazines published in the United States